Stylidium squamosotuberosum is a species of plant in the genus Stylidium (also known as trigger plants). It was described in 1969 by Sherwin Carlquist. Discovered in 1969.

Distribution 
This species of plant is most common in Western Australia, found in Perth, Wardandi, Pibelmenm, Minang, Koreng and Kaneang and less common in Northern Territory of Australia.

References 

squamosotuberosum
Plants described in 1969